Raja Babu is a 1994 Indian Hindi-language melodrama comedy film directed by David Dhawan. It stars Govinda, Karisma Kapoor, Shakti Kapoor, Kadar Khan, Aruna Irani, Prem Chopra and Gulshan Grover, with music by Anand–Milind and lyrics by Sameer. The film was inspired from the 1992 Tamil film Rasukutty.

Plot
Raja Singh a.k.a. Raja Babu is the sole heir to a rich village couple. He is good-hearted but is also spoilt, unsophisticated, and uneducated. Lakhan pretends to be an ally of Raja's rich father but is secretly embezzling funds. He also creates problems for Raja and his family.

Raja regularly visits the village photo studio and gets his picture taken, each time wearing a different outfit. He is always accompanied by his sidekick Nandu. He falls for Madhubala "Madhu" when he sees her photograph in the studio.

He harasses Madhu so that he can get her attention. Madhu becomes annoyed with Raja's antics and comes to his village with her entourage. In the ensuing confusion they mistake one of Raja's neighbors as Raja, Madhu's entourage kidnaps him and takes him back to their village. Later, Madhu sees one of Raja's photos as a Lawyer and mistakes his costume as the real thing. She agrees to marry him but accidentally finds out that Raja is not only not a lawyer, he is also completely illiterate. Enraged at this perceived duplicity, she rushes to Raja's house, tears up their wedding invitations, and insults Raja's father.

Raja still wants to marry Madhu, but his father refuses to grant him permission and tries to compel him to quickly marry a mentally challenged girl to save his family's honor. Raja refuses as he loves Madhu and ends up insulting the girl's parents. Angered at this insult, the girl's mother reveals a big secret regarding Raja's origins.

Raja becomes overwhelmed with gratitude and decides to do as his father says. In the meantime, Madhu understands that Raja did not deceive her and it was all a misunderstanding. She forgives him and declares her love for him. But Raja tells her about his changed situation and asks her to forget him. Madhu refuses to listen to him and pursues him anyway.

Raja's father misunderstands his son's intentions and kicks him out for breaking his promise of no longer seeing Madhu. Taking advantage of this tense situation, Lakhan plans to kill Raja's entire family and take control of their property. He along with his son Banke kidnaps Raja's parents. Raja rushes to rescue them. After a long fight, he manages to defeat his family's enemies. His father finally understands his son's deep love and respect for him and agrees to let him unite with Madhu.

Cast

Box office
Made on a budget of ₹2.30 crore, Raja Babu was successful at box office, managing to gross ₹15.26 crore worldwide.

Soundtrack

The lyrics of all the songs were penned by Sameer.

Reception

Notes

References

External links
 

1994 films
Indian action comedy films
Films scored by Anand–Milind
Films directed by David Dhawan
Hindi remakes of Tamil films
1990s Hindi-language films
1994 action comedy films